Kamardugh (also Romanized as Kamardūgh) is a village in Tayebi-ye Sarhadi-ye Sharqi Rural District, Charusa District, Kohgiluyeh County, Kohgiluyeh and Boyer-Ahmad Province, Iran. At the 2006 census, its population was 201, in 38 families.

References 

Populated places in Kohgiluyeh County